{{Album ratings
| rev1 = Allmusic
| rev1Score = <ref name=""allmusic"">{{cite web|url=https://www.allmusic.com/album/mw0000619572|title=Spanish Angel (Recorded Live in Spain)|work=Allmusic|accessdate=2022-04-24}}</ref>}}Spanish Angel'' is a live album by Paul Winter Consort, released in 1993 through the record label Living Music. In 1994, the album earned the group a Grammy Award for Best New Age Album.

Track listing
 "Fare Well" (Halley) – 7:02
 "Spanish Angel" (Friesen) – 6:48
 "Suite from the Man Who Planted Trees: Ballad of the Forest/The Planter" (Halley) – 5:36
 "Oak Theme/Todo Mundo" (Halley) – 6:27
 "Winter's Dream" (Halley) – 4:53
 "River Run" (Castro-Neves, Friesen, Halley, Velez, Winter) – 5:59
 "Almería Duet" (Friesen, Halley) – 8:25
 "Montana" (Halley) – 4:19
 "Music for a Sunday Night in Salamanca" (Friesen, Halley, Larson, Velez, Wadopian, Winter) – 8:49
 "Appalachian Morning" (Halley) – 4:54
 "Dancing Particles" (Halley, Velez, Winter) – 5:01
 "Blues for Cádiz" (Friesen, Halley, Larson, Velez) – 1:50

Personnel
 Paul Winter — soprano saxophone
 Rhonda Larson — flute
 Paul Halley — piano
 Eugene Friesen — cello
 Eliot Wadopian — bass
 Glen Velez — percussion

References

1993 live albums
Grammy Award for Best New Age Album
Paul Winter Consort albums